Fehmarn Belt, (former spelling Femer Bælt) is a strait connecting the Bay of Kiel and the Bay of Mecklenburg in the western part of the Baltic Sea between the German island of Fehmarn and the Danish island of Lolland. Ferries operated by Scandlines connect Puttgarden and Rødby on the two islands.

The strait features an 18-kilometre (10 nmi) wide area with depths of 20–30 metres. Currents in the strait are weak and mostly dependent on wind.

Swimming 
It was initially swum across by Christof Wandratsch.

Tunnel 

The Danish and German governments agreed on 29 June 2007 to build a fixed link to replace the ferry route. It is to save an hour on crossing the strait, and provide more crossing capacity.

In 2011, the Danish parliament voted overwhelmingly (with seven of eight parties supporting) for the €5.1 billion project that was intended to open in 2020. The tunnel is to have three separate bores, two containing two motorway lanes each, and one with a double-track railway line. Construction started on 1 January 2021.

Famous shipwrecks 

 13 October 1644 The Danish men-of-war Delmenhorst, Lindormen and the Dutch Swarte Arendt was sunk during the Battle of Fehmarn (1644)
 21 July 1932 The German school ship Niobe capsized during a  white squall

See also 

Fehmarn Belt Lightship

References 

Straits of Denmark
Bodies of water of Schleswig-Holstein
Straits of the Baltic Sea
Straits of Germany
Denmark–Germany border
International straits